Richard Fenn (born 23 May 1953) is an English rock guitarist. He has been a member of the band 10cc since 1976 and has also collaborated with Mike Oldfield, Rick Wakeman, Hollies singer Peter Howarth, and Pink Floyd drummer Nick Mason.

History 

Rick Fenn attended the Dragon School and Magdalen College School in Oxford. Fenn’s musical career started in Oxford where he was leader of the school band 'Bagshot Louie'. The band folded with the end of the school year in 1971 and Fenn moved to Cambridge, to attend the Cambridge College of Arts and Technology.

After completing an HND business studies course, Fenn joined a Cambridge band called Hamilton Gray who moved to Manchester and became the band 'Gentlemen'. Their debut TV appearance on a show called 'So It Goes' (along with the Sex Pistols) resulted in a liaison with Paul Burgess who soon after, recommended him to 10CC which he joined towards the end of 1976 at the launch of the Deceptive Bends album and has been part of the team ever since.

From 1979 he also toured and recorded with Mike Oldfield and with him co-wrote the song “Family Man” which went on to become a big hit for Hall & Oates all over the world and won him an A.S.C.A.P. award for best song in 1984.

In 1985, Fenn wrote and recorded his own album Profiles with the Pink Floyd’s drummer Nick Mason. The single from the album, "Lie for a Lie" sung by David Gilmour and featuring Maggie Reilly was a hit in the United States. Also in the 1980s Fenn and Mason formed Bamboo Music, a company that produced music jingles for corporate clients.

Over the years, Fenn has toured with artists such as Rick Wakeman, Jack Bruce, Elkie Brooks and Wax (with Andrew Gold and Graham Gouldman). As a guitarist, he has recorded with numerous artists among them Cliff Richard, Peter Green, Agnetha Fältskog (ABBA), Marilyn, Sniff 'n' the Tears, John Wetton, and Justin Hayward.

From the late 1980s, Fenn devoted more of his time to composing and wrote countless scores for television documentaries, dramas and comedies (including series for Hale and Pace and Craig Charles) and a number of feature films. Amongst those were White of the Eye which was another collaboration with Nick Mason. Over the years he has won several awards for high-profile commercial sound tracks.

One soundtrack that won Fenn a Gold Clio award in America in 1989 for best song, featured Peter Howarth on vocals. He went on to form a writing partnership with Howarth, now the lead singer with the Hollies, and in 1990 they wrote a rock opera called "Robin, Prince of Sherwood" which toured the UK for a year and spent four months in the West End. Fenn and Howarth have other projects in the pipeline. They also periodically assemble a troupe of prominent musicians and perform as the Feramones.

Fenn recently toured throughout Germany as part of the Nokia Night of the Proms Band where, as well as 10cc, he played with Tears For Fears, Robin Gibb, and Kim Wilde.

When not working with 10CC, Fenn now spends most of his time at his home near Byron Bay, New South Wales, in Australia, with his wife and daughter Heather and Ruby-Mae where he has also collaborated with Australian rock legend Brian Cadd on various projects including a stage musical.

Discography

With Mason + Fenn 

 Profiles – 1985
 Life Could Be a Dream – 1986 (soundtrack) 
 White of the Eye – 1987 (soundtrack)
 Body Contact – 1987 (soundtrack)
 Tank Malling – 1989 (soundtrack)

With 10cc 

 Live and Let Live – 1977
 Bloody Tourists – 1978
 Look Hear? – 1980
 Ten Out of 10 – 1981
 Windows in the Jungle – 1983
 Alive – 1993
 Mirror Mirror – 1995
 Clever Clogs – 2008

With Eric Stewart 

 Girls – 1980
 Frooty Rooties – 1982

With Graham Gouldman 

 Animalympics (1980)
 And Another Thing... (2000) 
 Love and Work (2012)

With Agnetha Fältskog 

 Eyes of a Woman – 1985

With Peter Howarth 

 Robin Prince of Sherwood – 1992
 Androcles and the Lion – 1995
 And Still I Fly – 2020

With Mike Oldfield 

 QE2 – 1980
 Live at Montreux 1981 – 1981
 Five Miles Out – 1982
 Crises – 1983
 Islands – 1987

With Rick Wakeman 

 Crimes of Passion (soundtrack) – 1984
 Silent Nights – 1985
 Live at Hammersmith – 1985

With Sniff 'n' the Tears 

 Love Action – 1981

With Michael Mantler 

 Live – 1987 – with Jack Bruce and Nick Mason
 Many Have No Speech – (Watt/ECM) — with Jack Bruce Marianne Faithfull, Robert Wyatt
 The Watt Works Family Album – : (WATT/ECM) —
 Folly Seeing All This – 1993: (ECM) —

With Peter Green 

 Blues for Dhyana – 1998
 The Clown – 2001

With Tanita Tikaram 

 The Cappucino Songs – 1998

With Wax 

 Live in Concert 1987 – 2019

References 

1953 births
Living people
People educated at The Dragon School
People educated at Magdalen College School, Oxford
Alumni of Anglia Ruskin University
English rock guitarists
10cc members